Fernbank is an unincorporated community in Lamar County, Alabama, United States, on the north bank of Luxapallila Creek. Fernbank is located approximately five miles northwest of Millport.

History
The community was originally named Baltimore in honor of Baltimore, Maryland. The name was later changed to Fernbank due to the ferns growing in the surrounding area. The community is located on the former Georgia Pacific Railway and was once home to a Masonic lodge, sawmill, and drugstore.

A post office operated under the name Fernbank from 1884 to 1986.

References 

Unincorporated communities in Lamar County, Alabama
Unincorporated communities in Alabama